Maribel Rodríguez is a Puerto Rican politician from the Popular Democratic Party (PPD). Rodríguez served as member of the 22nd Senate of Puerto Rico from 2001 to 2005.

Rodríguez was elected to the Senate of Puerto Rico in the 2000 general election. She represented the District of Arecibo, along with Rafael Rodríguez Vargas. However, Rodríguez was forced to retire due to irregularities in her finances. Her then-husband, Juan Manuel Cruzado, mayor of Vega Alta, was also being investigated for corruption and money laundering. Rodríguez resignation was effective on March 7, 2002.

See also
22nd Senate of Puerto Rico

References

Living people
Members of the Senate of Puerto Rico
People from Vega Alta, Puerto Rico
Year of birth missing (living people)